Sayyid ul Sadaat Sayyid Mir Fazlullah bin Sayyid Mir Hasan Naqshbandi (born in Kabul) was a Sufi Saint and the highest Qadi (Qadi ul Qudhad) and Grand Mufti of the Emirate of Afghanistan.

Ancestry 
Sayyid Mir Fazlullah is a Sayyid (a descendant of Muhammad through his daughter Fatimah and his cousin Ali ibn Abi Talib).  Among his ancestors are seven of the Twelve Imams, and in another lineage eleven of the Twelve Imams, Sayyid Bahauddin Naqshband, Sayyid Alauddin Atar, and Khwaja Khawand Mahmud (also known as Hazrat Ishaan) also.

After the Battle of Karbala, the ancestors of Sayyid Mir fazlullah, known as Ahl al-Bayt went back to Medina. From there Musa al Kazim was forced to go to Iraq. The Musavis, i.e. the descendants of Musa al Kadhim, settled to Persia. One of them was Khwaja Sayyid Mir Ismail Muhammad Hakim, father of Khwaja Sayyid Mir Latif, an ancestor of Sayyid Mir Fazlullah. The descendants of Sayyid Mir Latif immigrated to Bokhara and after that to Kabul to guide the Muslims there, where Sayyid Mir Fazlullah was born.

Sayyid Mir Fazlullah's ancestors were as said also Askari Sayyids, i.e. descendants of Imam Hasan al-Askari, through his son Sayyid Ali Akbar, whose existence was hidden, because of political conflicts. Sayyid Ali Akbars descendants also migrated to Bokhara, where the prominent Sufi saint Bahauddin Naqshband, founder of the Naqshbandi Sufi Order, was born. A descendant of Bahauddin Naqshband after 7 generations was Hazrat Ishaan, whose descendants later immigrated to variable regions of South Asia, like Khorasan, today known as Afghanistan in order to spread the Ishaqiyya Naqshbandiyya branch's teachings.

Family 
His family was the highest authority of the descendants of Muhammad in Afghanistan, holding an office similar to that of the Naqib ul Ashraf in Iraq. Their title was Sayyid ul Sadaat.

His older brothers were Sayyid Mir Jan, the highest authority of the Naqshbandi Tariqa and Sayyid ul Sadaat Mir Sayyid Mahmud Agha, Deputy of Sayyid Mir Jan.

His family was especially known for their saintness and deep knowledge in Fiqh and Tariqah, which was transmitted from father to son from Muhammad. Furthermore, they initiated projects for the sake of disadvantaged people, especially orphan children.
They were also inheritors of many historical relics, like clothing collections of Imam Hussein ibn Ali.

Lineage 
His lineage is as follows:

 Muhammad
 Sayyidina Ali Al Murtadha and Sayyida Fatimah al Zahra
 Imam Hasan and Imam Hussein
 Imam Ali Zayn ul Abideen
 Imam Muhammad al-Baqir
 Imam Jafar al-Sadiq
 Imam Musa al-Kadhim
 Sayyid ul Sadaat Abu Qasim Sayyid Mir Hamza
 Sayyid ul Sadaat Sayyid Qasim
 Sayyid ul Sadaat Sayyid Ahmad
 Sayyid ul Sadaat Sayyid Muhammad
 Sayyid ul Sadaat Sayyid Mir Ismail Muhammad Hakim al-Tirmidhi
 Sayyid ul Sadaat Sayyid Mir Latif
 Sayyid ul Sadaat Sayyid Mir Muhammad
 Sayyid ul Sadaat Sayyid Mir Kulal
 Sayyid ul Sadaat Sayyid Mir Ahmad
 Sayyid ul Sadaat Sayyid Mir Hashim
 Sayyid ul Sadaat Sayyid Mir Mast Ali
 Sayyid ul Sadaat Sayyid Mir Dost Ali
 Sayyid ul Sadaat Sayyid Mir Muhammad Latif
 Sayyid ul Sadaat Sayyid Mir Abdullah
 Sayyid ul Sadaat Sayyid Mir Muhammad Shamah
 Sayyid ul Sadaat Sayyid Mir Latifullah
 Sayyid ul Sadaat Sayyid Mir Ruhollah
 Sayyid ul Sadaat Sayyid Mir Baitullah
 Sayyid ul Sadaat Sayyid Mir Nimatullah
 Sayyid ul Sadaat Sayyid Mir Azimullah
 Sayyid ul Sadaat Sayyid Mir Hasan
 Sayyid ul Sadaat Sayyid Mir Fazlullah

Career 
Sayyid Mir Fazlullah was educated by his father Sayyid ul Sadaat Sayyid Mir Hasan, transmitting the legacy of his ancestors to him until there was nothing to learn in Afghanistan.

He became Qadi and was known for his dedicated stance on the prestige and enforcement of Sharia law.

Sayyid Mir Fazlullah was internationally acknowledged and was a spiritual retreat for Sultan Abdülhamit II.

In one of his visits to Istanbul, Ottoman Empire, he held a speech, that attracted the masses in such a way, that a sign of trance and ecstasy could be seen on the faces of the audience. Upon this Sultan Abdul Hamid II, asked Sayyid Mir Fazlullah to stay in Istanbul and to become the Grand Mufti. Sultan Abdulhamid II immediately sent a letter to Amir Habibullah to ask for his transfer to Istanbul. Amir Habibullah refused, since he himself and the Afghans were dependent on Sayyid Mir Fazlullah.

Private life and legacy

Dakik Family 
In honor of Sayyid Mir Fazlullah Agha´s ancestor Hazrat Ishaan, Dakik Family also known as the House of Hazrat Ishaan are continuing his legacy. The Dakik Family are biological descendants of Sayyid Mir Fazlullah Agha whose granddaughter HRH Princess Sayyida Rahima Dakik is the family´s matriarch. She married with a Prince of the Afghan Royal Family, acting as UN Ambassador.

List of descendants 
Sayyid Mir Fazlullah had two wives and two sons:

 1.His Serene Highness Sayyid Mir Muhammad Jan (1900-1955), Sufi Saint and high officer in the Kingdom of Afghanistan

 a)HRH Princess Sayyida Bibi Rahima Begum daughter of Sayyid Mir Muhammad Jan, successor based on the will of her father, female Wali, matriarch of Dakik Family

  aa)HRH Sultan Masood Dakik (b.1967), son of Sayyida Bibi Rahima, Afghan Barakzai Prince, lobbyist, entrepreneur, philanthropist, married his cousin Sayyida Nargis (cc),  granddaughter of Sayyid Mir Muhammad Jan (1.) and philanthropist. 

 b) Sayyid Mir Assadullah Sadat, son of Mir Muhammad Jan and younger brother of Sayyida Bibi Rahima

  cc) HRH Princess Sayyida Bibi Nargis Begum (b. 1978), married her cousin HRH Sultan Masood Dakik of Afghanistan (see above 1. a) aa)) ). 
  Both live in Germany and have three children:

   aaa)HRH Prince Sayyid Raphael Dakik (b. 1998), Afghan Barakzai Prince, Oil and Gas 
       Lawyer, Freelance Diplomat and Political Counsel for Legislative and Governmental Affairs   
   bbb)HRH Prince Sayyid Mir Matin (b.2000)   
   ccc)HRH Prince Sayyid Mir Hamid (b. 2002)]]

 2. His Serene Highness Sayyid Mir Sharif, died in his youth and left no children

See also 
 Muhammad
 fourteen infallibles
 Sheikh Abdul Qadir Jilani
 Sayyid Ali Akbar
 Bahauddin Naqshband
 Hazrat Ishaan
 Ziyarat Naqshband Saheb
 Sayyid Moinuddin Hadi Naqshband
 Sayyid Mir Jan
 Sayyid Mahmud Agha
Sultan Masood Dakik

References 

People from Kabul
Afghan Sufi saints
Qadis
Grand Muftis